Admetula cornidei is a species of sea snail, a marine gastropod mollusk in the family Cancellariidae, the nutmeg snails.

Description
The size of the thin, ovately oblong shell varies between 9 mm and 12 mm. The color of the shell goes from brown to whitish. The protoconch is paucispiral with its axis slightly deviated from the main axis. The teleoconch consists of 3 ¼ rounded whorls, axially crossed by 15 to 20 broad, rounded ribs, less conspicuous at the margin of the oblong aperture (peristome). The outer lip is slightly crenulated and contains six lirae (fine linear elevations of shelly material). The columella is abaxially inclined and shows three folds with the siphonal fold displaying a noticeable tooth. The shell lacks an umbilicus. The periostracum is covered with very short hairs along the spiral lines.

Distribution
This species is found in European waters and in the Atlantic Ocean along Western Sahara, Canary Islands and Mauritania at depths between 50 m and 125 m.

References

External links
 

Cancellariidae
Gastropods described in 1978
Molluscs of the Atlantic Ocean
Molluscs of the Canary Islands
Invertebrates of West Africa
Fauna of Western Sahara